Monkey King, or Sun Wukong, is a main character in the classical Chinese epic novel Journey to the West. (The novel was also translated as The Monkey King by George Theiner in 1964.)

Monkey King may also refer to:

Monkey King (horse) (born 2002), New Zealand racehorse
The Monkey King (Mo novel), a 1978 novel by Timothy Mo
The Monkey King (TV miniseries), a 2001 American television mini-series
The Monkey King (manga), a 2002 dark fantasy manga series
The Monkey King: Quest for the Sutra, a 2002 Hong Kong and Taiwanese TV series
The Monkey King (film), a 2014 film
Havoc in Heaven or The Monkey King, a 1961 & 1964 Chinese two-part animated film
Monkey King, a 2001 picture book by Ed Young
Monkey King: Hero Is Back, 2015 Chinese film
Tancred, King of Sicily from 1189 - 1194, belittled as "The Monkey King" by his critics
Lego Monkie Kid, a Lego theme and animated series released in Asian markets in 2020

See also
Journey to the West (disambiguation)
The Monkey King's Daughter, a young adult novel series by T. A. DeBonis